Timothy Nagle (25 October 1894 – 6 January 1925) was an Irish hurler. His championship career with the Cork senior team lasted from 1912 until 1922.

Nagle first played competitive inter-county hurling at the age of eighteen when he was selected for the Cork senior team. He made his debut in the 1912 All-Ireland final and, although Cork were defeated on that occasion, he quickly became a regular member of the team. Nagle won  All-Ireland medals in 1915 and 1919 in what was his third final appearance. He also won three Munster medals. Nagle played his last game for Cork in April 1922.

Honours

Cork
All-Ireland Senior Hurling Championship (1): 1919
Munster Senior Hurling Championship (3): 1915, 1919, 1920

References

1894 births
1925 deaths
Cork inter-county hurlers
St Mary's (Shandon) hurlers